The US Virgin Islands participated at the 2018 Summer Youth Olympics in Buenos Aires, Argentina from 6 October to 18 October 2018.

Athletics

Swimming

Triathlon

Individual

Relay

References

2018 in United States Virgin Islands sports
Nations at the 2018 Summer Youth Olympics
Virgin Islands at the Youth Olympics